Canthigaster papua, also known as the Papuan toby , is a  demersal Marine fish belonging to the family Tetraodontidae.

The Papuan toby  is a small sized fish which grows up to 10 cm.

It is widely distributed throughout the tropical waters of the Indian Ocean and of the western Pacific Ocean.

It inhabits coral reefs with clear water in lagoons and external slope even drop-off from 6 to 50 m.
Canthigaster papua  has a diurnal activity.

It occasionally makes its way into the aquarium trade.

References

External links

papua
Taxa named by Pieter Bleeker
Fish described in 1848